The term window security may refer to any of a range of measures used to avoid unauthorized access through windows, and prevent crimes such as burglary and home invasions. Window security is used in commercial and government buildings, as well as in residential settings.

History 
In ancient Greek and Roman houses grilles were rarely used and had simple designs, rectangular or diamond-shaped, as it appears in 1st and 2nd-century wall paintings. In medieval times some castles, prisons and convents were protected by rudimentary iron grilles. From the 11th century to 15th, in France, Spain, Germany and Italy the blacksmiths started to take care of beauty of their products, so the grilles started to be characterized by iron and bronze decorative motifs. While French blacksmiths approached the highest perfection in the execution of Gothic and Baroque grilles, Italian ones maintained the sobriety of design. After attempts to imitate stylistically these grilles in the 19th century, the simplicity of design has taken over, and particular importance is given to the materials and the execution. Openable bars have been introduced to the market.

In Britain, in the middle of the 1800s glass started to be used in the ordinary shops, but wooden shutters were retained to protect the goods exposed. At about this time metal grilles started to be used at night to allow passersby to view the goods on display. Metal roller shutters were introduced in the late 1970s and early 1980s  as a response to street riots throughout the United Kingdom, but now there are alternative solutions for the security of shops.

Security devices

Physical barriers 
 Grilles 
 Laminated glass
 Window locks
 External or internal window shutters (roller shutters, louvers, etc.)

According to the European standards (EN 1627, EN 1628, EN 1629 and EN 1630), the resistance of a closing system can be classified in six levels, for which it has to be tested in standardized modalities for its ability to resist to different tools in different time intervals.

Surveillance 
 Wired or wireless security alarms can be designed to warn intrusions through windows, using sensors like glass break detectors and contact magnetic sensors
 Security lighting (including those systems with automatic light switch and timers) is useful to make evident an attempt of unauthorized access
 Video surveillance is today able to send alarm signals from the system on electronic devices

Trade-offs 
Window locks may be difficult to use for elderly or disabled people, but easier to use locks have become available. In addition, during a fire or a similar emergency situation in which it is necessary to escape, lockable windows, window shutters or grilles (especially fixed ones) may become dangerous obstacles, so it is necessary to ensure that the keys are as close to the windows as is practical or, if a window is an important emergency exit, that it can be opened from the inside without the use of a key.

See also 
 Door security

Sources 

Burglary
Windows
Physical security